"One for the Money" is a song written by Buck Moore and Mentor Williams, and recorded by American country music artist T. G. Sheppard.  It was released in September 1987 as the first single and title track from the album One for the Money.  The song reached #2 on the Billboard Hot Country Singles & Tracks chart. It was Sheppard's last Top 10 hit.

Chart performance

References

1987 singles
1987 songs
T. G. Sheppard songs
Songs written by Buck Moore
Songs written by Mentor Williams
Columbia Records singles